Charli Paul Frank Monét Finch (born 14 August 2001), known professionally as Anubis Finch, or mononymously as Anubis, is an English drag queen and singer who is best known for being a contestant on the third series of RuPaul's Drag Race UK in 2021. They have also released an extended play, Anubis (2019) as well as three singles.

Biography
Charli Finch was born on 14 August 2001 in Seaford, East Sussex. Following the death of their father when they were 16, they lost nine stone and began performing as a drag queen under the name Anubis Finch, a name they chose to pay homage to their father's Egyptian heritage. In 2019, they released an extended play Anubis. and later that year a cover of "Have Yourself A Merry Little Christmas". In 2020, they released another single, "Home". In 2021, they were announced as one of the contestants competing on the third series of RuPaul's Drag Race UK. They were the first contestant to be eliminated from the competition after losing a lip sync against Elektra Fence. Despite this, they were later crowned Miss Congeniality by their fellow competitors. In 2022, Finch released their single "Wonderland" and embarked on the RuPaul's Drag Race UK: The Official Tour alongside the cast of series 3.

Filmography

Television

Stage

Discography

Extended plays
 Anubis (2019)

Singles

References

External links 

2001 births
Living people
British people of Egyptian descent
English drag queens
People from Brighton
People from Eastbourne
RuPaul's Drag Race UK contestants